Make Peace (or Makepeace) is a historic home located at Crisfield, Somerset County, Maryland, United States.

It is a -story Flemish bond brick house of the early 18th century.

Make Peace was listed on the National Register of Historic Places in 1975.

References

External links
, including photo from 1996, at Maryland Historical Trust

Houses in Somerset County, Maryland
Crisfield, Maryland
Houses on the National Register of Historic Places in Maryland
Houses completed in 1725
Historic American Buildings Survey in Maryland
1725 establishments in Maryland
National Register of Historic Places in Somerset County, Maryland